Leslie Laing (29 August 1873 – 6 July 1933) was a South African sports shooter. He competed in the team free rifle event at the 1924 Summer Olympics.

References

External links
 

1873 births
1933 deaths
South African male sport shooters
Olympic shooters of South Africa
Shooters at the 1924 Summer Olympics
Place of birth missing